Kėdainiai City Eldership is a Lithuanian eldership, located in a central part of Kėdainiai District Municipality. It covers city of Kėdainiai, which is its administrative seat, and surrounding areas.

Eldership was created at 2001, when former Kėdainiai City Eldership and part of the Kėdainiai Rural Eldership where merged.

Geography
All the territory is in Nevėžis plain.
 Rivers: Nevėžis, Smilga, Jaugila, Dotnuvėlė, Obelis, Smilgaitis;
 Lakes and ponds: Keleriškiai pond, Kėdainiai pond, Babėnai pond;
 Forests: Josvainiai forest, Babėnai park, Daumantai forest;
 Protected areas: Smilga and Smilgaitis landscape sanctuary, Dotnuvėlė landscape sanctuary.

Populated places 
Following settlements are located in the Kėdainiai City Eldership (as for 2011 census):

Cities: Kėdainiai
Villages: Bartkūniškiai · Bogušiškiai · Daukšiai · Daumantai · Janušava · Justinava · Kėboniai · Keleriškiai · Kropilai · Lipliūnai · Mantviloniai · Mištautai · Novočėbė · Pasmilgys · Pikeliai · Pūstelninkai · Ruminiai · Ruoščiai · Stasiūnai · Šiukštuliškiai · Šventoniškis · Tubiai · Varėnai · Varkoliai;
Hamlets: Čeplinava · Klamputė.

References

Elderships in Kėdainiai District Municipality